We is a 2018 Belgian–Dutch drama film written, directed and co-produced by Rene Eller. The movie was released on January 27, 2018, at the International Film Festival Rotterdam.

Plot
In a boring summer, a group of eight friends (four male and four female) decide to find news ways to entertain themselves. They allow their sexual curiosity to run freely and engage in several sexual games, as well as commit several violent crimes. The story is told non-linearly, with four of the youths recounting what happened during their trial after they have been apprehended for the death of one of their group.

Cast
 Aimé Claeys as Thomas
 Tijmen Govaerts as Simon
 Pauline Casteleyn as Liesl
 Maxime Jacobs as Ruth
 Friso van der Werf as Jens
 Folkert Verdoorn as Karl
 Laura Drosopoulos as Ena
 Salomé van Grunsven as Femke
 Lieselot Siddiki as Loesje
 Gaia Sofia Cozijn as Sarah

Soundtrack 

 Tiptoe Falls: "Hush"
 Colin Stetson: "The Stars in His Head (Dark Lights Remix)"
 Colin Stetson: "In Love and in Justice"
 Colin Stetson: "From No Part of Me"
 Colin Stetson: "Won't Be a Thing to Become"
 Colin Stetson: "And Still They Move"
 Colin Stetson: "As a Bird or Branch"
 Colin Stetson: "Lord I Just Can't Keep From Crying"
 Blind Willie Johnson: "Lord I Just Can't Keep From Crying"
 David Hamilton: "Schubert - Arpeggione Sonata (1st Movement)"
 Jackson Tennessee Fourgeaud: "ARP #1"
 Colin Stetson: "Red Horse Judges II"

Release

Reception
Patricia Smagge from the "Cinemagazine" wrote: "This film can be seen as a fascinating but jet-black portrait of a generation, or as a disturbing account in which it would have been better to devote more attention to the elaboration of the story and the characters than to bringing moral decay into the picture as explicitly as possible. You will have an opinion about 'We' anyway because it is a film that leaves its mark. David Pountain writing for FilmDoo stated: "Rene Eller’s bold and sinister portrayal of hedonistic youth is an alarming statement of collective identity, putting a generation’s worst impulses on display while suggesting that the larger ‘we’ of modern society is no less inclined to destruction and debauchery." Alex McLevy of The A.V. Club decried its nihilistic tone, conceding that "It’s a fairly well-directed and well-acted endeavor, which only adds to the disgust at what a waste it was having talented folks spend so much time on what’s essentially I Dare You to Care About This: The Movie", with pointless violence and cruelty, summing it up as "awful".

Accolades
We won the Golden Calf (award) of "Best Editing" (for Wouter van Luijn) at the 2018 Nederlands Film Festival., the "Best Director" (for Rene Eller) at the 2018 Raindance Film Festival and the "RIFF Jury Award" of "Best Film" at the Rome Independent Film Festival.

We was nominated for the "German Independence Award" of "Best Film" at the Oldenburg International Film Festival, the "KNF Award" at the International Film Festival Rotterdam and the "Best European First Film" at the Zlín Film Festival.

References

External links
 

Dutch drama films
Belgian drama films
2018 drama films
Juvenile sexuality in films
Juvenile delinquency in fiction
Teensploitation
Films scored by Colin Stetson